The Großer Finsterberg is a mountain, in the Thuringian Forest not far from the villages of Stützerbach and Schmiedefeld am Rennsteig. It is the third highest peak in the German state of Thuringia.

Description 

The volcanic origin of the Großer Finsterberg may be seen clearly from the conical shape of its summit, which tilts markedly towards the west.

Apart from the summit plateau, the mountain is completely covered by a nearly natural cotton and reed grass spruce woodland and in most places there is no shrub layer. On the plateau a special mountain pasture vegetation has formed with baldmoney, veronica and St. John's wort.

Location

Subpeaks and boundaries 
One kilometre away to the north-northeast is its smaller brother, the Kleiner Finsterberg or Finsterberger Köpfchen.
Two less spectacular eastern subpeaks, 2 to 3  kilometres distant both bear the name Rosenkopf ( and ). To the west, northwest and north the Finsterberg is bounded by the Freibach and, to the southeast, by the Taubach, both headstreams of the Ilm.

Neighbouring peaks 
Two kilometres to the southwest and separated by the Rennsteig (ca. 800 metres away), is the Großer Eisenberg. To the northwest, four to five kilometres away, are the two main summits of the range, the Schneekopf and the Großer Beerberg, both of which are higher than the Finsterberg.

History 
Since the middle of the 18th century at the Mordfleck (1.5 kilometres east of the summit) and at the Blauer Stein (1 km away to the northwest), stone coal has been mined.

Towards the end of the Second World War, soldiers' graves were dug on the mountainside. From 1954 to 1990 the summit of the Großer Finsterberg was used by the Soviet Union for military purposes and was thus out of bounds to the public.

View 

Between 1999 or 2001 and 2017 or 2018, a wooden observation platform stood at the summit of the Großer Finsterberg. , there are plans to reinstate the tower. On the east side there is a small hut with another observation point.

References

External links 

Mountains under 1000 metres
Mountains of Thuringia
Thuringian Forest
Ilm-Kreis